Strictly 4 My N.I.G.G.A.Z... is the second studio album by American rapper 2Pac, released on February 16, 1993, by Interscope. N.I.G.G.A. in the title is punctuated to refer to 2Pac's backronym "Never Ignorant in Getting Goals Accomplished". The album features guest appearances from the group Live Squad, 2Pac's stepbrother the Wycked (later known as "Mopreme", later a member of 2Pac's groups Thug Life and the Outlawz), Ice-T, Ice Cube, Treach, Apache, Poppi, Deadly Threat, R&B singer Dave Hollister and Digital Underground.

Similar to his debut, 2Pacalypse Now, the album contains many tracks emphasizing 2Pac's political and social views. The original album was going to be named "Troublesome 21" and released in September 1992, but it was scrapped due to being rejected by Time Warner. Many of these tracks still remained unreleased while "Keep Ya Head Up", "I Get Around", "Strictly 4 My N.I.G.G.A.Z.", "The Streetz R Deathrow" and "Souljah's Revenge" were utilized for the new track listing. Debuting at number 24 on the Billboard 200, this album saw more commercial success than its predecessor, and there are many noticeable differences in production.

While 2Pac's first effort included a more underground or indie rap-oriented sound, this album was considered his "breakout" album. It spawned the hits "Keep Ya Head Up" and "I Get Around". As of 2011, Strictly 4 My N.I.G.G.A.Z... has sold 1,639,584 units in the United States.  In commemoration of its twenty-fifth anniversary, it was released on 180 gram double vinyl on February 16, 2018.

Critical reception 

Strictly 4 My N.I.G.G.A.Z... received generally positive reviews from critics. Melody Maker called the album "an adventure into life on the streets of America", delivered through raps that "drip with the sweat of hardcore funk". The Source said: "A combination of '60s black political thought and '90s urban reality, 2Pac is not afraid to speak his mind ... [balancing] the gangsta tendencies of street life with insightful revelations". Strictly 4 My N.I.G.G.A.Z..., wrote Ian McCann in Q, "found 2Pac feted by Hollywood and Ice Cube no longer an influence but a guest. Bitter, more distant, it offers the legendary 5 Deadly Venomz, Keep Ya Head Up and, ominously, Something 2 Die 4, on which 2Pac's ma warns him if he can't find something to live for, he should find something worth dying for. Gulp."

In a less enthusiastic review for the Los Angeles Times, Jonathan Gold found the production accomplished and 2Pac's raps "sort of entertaining" but regarded him as "a gifted mimic" with "no discernible style of his own" and "not an especially deep thinker". Robert Christgau singled out "Keep Ya Head Up" as the record's only worthy track.

Commercial performance 
Strictly 4 My N.I.G.G.A.Z. debuted at number 24 on the US Billboard 200 and number four on the US Top R&B/Hip-Hop Albums, selling 38,000 units in its first week. On April 19, 1995, the album was certified platinum by the Recording Industry Association of America (RIAA) for sales of over one million copies in the United States. As of September 2011, the album has sold 1,639,584 copies in the United States.

Track listing 

All tracks co-produced by 2Pac.

Notes
"Holler If Ya Hear Me" features vocals by Live Squad 
"Keep Ya Head Up" features vocals by Dave Hollister credited as "The Black Angel"
Background vocals on "Strictly 4 My N.I.G.G.A.Z..." performed by Pacific Heights
Digital Underground members present on "I Get Around" are Money-B and Shock G

Samples 

Holler If Ya Hear Me
"Atomic Dog" by George Clinton
"Do It Any Way You Wanna" by The People's Choice
"Get Off Your Ass and Jam" by Funkadelic
"Rebel Without a Pause" by Public Enemy
"So Fine" by Howard Johnson

Pac's Theme (Interlude)
"Tennessee" by Arrested Development
"Snatch It Back and Hold It" by Junior Wells' Chicago Blues Band
"Bouncy Lady" by Pleasure
"Another Nigga in the Morgue" by The Geto Boys

Point the Finga
"Bop Gun (Endangered Species)" by Parliament
"Warm It Up" by Kris Kross
"One Man Band (Plays All Alone)" by Monk Higgins and the Specialities
"Gota Let Your Nuts Hang" by The Geto Boys

Something 2 Die 4 (Interlude)
"(Don't Worry) If There's a Hell Below, We're All Going to Go" by Curtis Mayfield
"Impeach the President" by The Honey Drippers

Last Wordz
"Better Off Dead" by "The Nigga Ya Love to Hate" by Ice Cube
"I Gotta Say What Up!!!" by Ice Cube
"Dog'n the Wax" by Ice-T
"Holy Ghost" by The Bar-Kays
"Flash Light" by Parliament
"The Grunt" by The J.B.'s
"Blind Alley" by The Emotions
"Tha Lunatic" by 2Pac

Souljah's Revenge
"Sing a Simple Song" by Sly and the Family Stone
"The Payback" by James Brown
"Hallelujah, I Love Her So" by Ray Charles
"Soulja's Story" by 2Pac

Peep Game
"Sing a Simple Song" by Sly and the Family Stone
"Caught, Can We Get a Witness?" by Public Enemy
"Bring the Noise" by Public Enemy
"Synthetic Substitution" by Melvin Bliss
"Don't Change Your Love" by The Five Stairsteps
"UFO" by ESG
"Planet Rock" by Afrika Bambaataa and the Soulsonic Force
"Heartbeat" by Taana Gardner
"Think (About It)" by Lyn Collins
"Funky President (People It's Bad)" by James Brown
"JD's Gafflin' (Part 2)" by Ice Cube
"Our Most Requested Record (Long Version)" by Ice-T
"Different Strokes" by Syl Johnson
"Mind Blowin by The D.O.C.
"Anarquia" by Ronnie Von
"If My Homie Calls" by 2Pac

Strugglin'
"Ashley's Roachclip" by The Soul Searchers
"Paid in Full" by Eric B. & Rakim
"I'm Gonna Get You" by Sir John Quarterman & Free Soul

Guess Who's Back
"Looking Out My Window" by Tom Jones
"Ironside" by Quincy Jones
"I'm Special Ed" by Special Ed

Representin' 93
"Diary of a Madman" by Scarface
"The Payback" by James Brown
"This One's for You" by Joe Public
"Get Up (I Feel Like Being a) Sex Machine" by James Brown
"Funky President (People It's Bad)" by James Brown

Keep Ya Head Up
"Be Alright" by Zapp
"O-o-h Child" by The Five Stairsteps

Strictly 4 My N.I.G.G.A.Z...
"Miss Broadway" by Belle Epoque
"UFO" by ESG
"Good Old Music" by Funkadelic

The Streetz R Deathrow
"You're the One I Need" by Barry White
"Synthetic Substitution" by Melvin Bliss
"Us" by Ice Cube

I Get Around
"Computer Love" by Zapp
"I Can Make You Dance" by Zapp
"The Ladder" by Prince and the Revolution
"Impeach the President" by The Honey Drippers
"Step in the Arena" by Gang Starr
"New York, New York" by Grandmaster Flash and the Furious Five

Papa'z Song
"Soul Shadows" by The Crusaders and Bill Withers
"Fool Yourself" by Little Feat

5 Deadly Venomz
"The Chokin' Kind" by Joe Simon
"Roots and Culture" by Shabba Ranks

Charts

Weekly charts

Year-end charts

Certifications

References 

1993 albums
Tupac Shakur albums
Political hip hop albums
Interscope Records albums
Jive Records albums
Albums produced by Laylaw
Political music albums by American artists